Laraki is a Moroccan sports car manufacturer.

Laraki may also refer to:

Ahmed Laraki (born 1931), Prime Minister of Morocco 1969–1971
Azzeddine Laraki (1929–2010), Prime Minister of Morocco 1986–1992

See also
Al-Iraqi (disambiguation)